Colombian cuisine is a compound of the culinary traditions of the six main regions within Colombia (Pacific, Amazonian, Andean, Orinoco, Caribbean, and Insular). Colombian cuisine varies regionally and is particularly influenced by Indigenous Colombian, Spanish, and African cuisines, with slight Arab influence in some regions. Furthermore, being one of the most biodiverse countries in the world, Colombia has one of the widest variety of available ingredients depending on the region.

History of Colombian food 
Colombian food is a unique blend of indigenous and European traditions with a strong Afro-Caribbean influence. The two largest indigenous groups prior to European conquest were the Tairona, who lived along the Caribbean coast, and the Muisca, who lived in the highlands to the South. Arepas, made from ground corn, are one of the oldest cooked dishes in Colombian cuisine. It is believed that the name derives from the word for corn in the Chibcha languages. Arepas are a popular modern Colombian dish.

Regional cuisines

Colombia's varied cuisine is influenced by its diverse fauna and flora as well as the cultural traditions of several ethnic groups. Colombian dishes and ingredients vary widely by region. Some of the most common ingredients are cereals such as rice and maize; tubers such as potato and cassava; assorted legumes; meats, including beef, chicken, pork and goat; and fish and other seafood. Colombian cuisine also features a variety of tropical fruits such as cape gooseberry, feijoa, arazá, dragon fruit, mangostino, granadilla, papaya, guava, blackberry, lulo, soursop and passionfruit.

Among the most representative appetizers and soups are patacones (fried green plantains), sancocho de gallina (chicken soup with root vegetables), ajiaco (potato and corn soup), and buñuelos (Christmas season deep fried dough balls).

Representative snacks and breads are pandebono, arepas (corn cakes), aborrajados (fried sweet plantains with cheese), torta de choclo, empanadas and almojábanas.

Representative main courses are bandeja paisa, lechona tolimense, tamales, and fish dishes such as arroz de lisa, especially in coastal regions where suero, costeño cheese, kibbeh and carimañolas are also eaten.

Representative side dishes are papas criollas al horno (roasted Andean potatoes), papas chorreadas (potatoes with messy cheese), and arroz con coco (coconut rice). Organic food is a current trend in big cities, although in general the country's fruits and vegetables are very natural and fresh.

Representative desserts are  natillas, torta Maria Luisa, bocadillo made of guayaba (guava jelly), cocadas (coconut balls), casquitos de guayaba (candied guava peels), torta de natas, obleas, flan de arequipe, roscón, milhoja, and the tres leches cake (sponge cake soaked in 3 types of milk). 

Typical sauces are hogao, a tomato onion sauce, and ají, a spicy raw cilantro-based sauce used as a condiment for many dishes and sides.

Some representative beverages are coffee (Tinto), champús, cholado, lulada, avena colombiana, sugarcane juice, aguapanela, hot chocolate, and fresh fruit juices (often made with sugar and water or milk).

There are a large variety of dishes that take into account the differences in regional climates. For example:
 In the city of Medellín, the typical dish is the bandeja paisa. It includes beans, rice, ground meat or carne asada, chorizo, fried egg, arepa, and chicharrón. It is usually accompanied by avocado, tomato, and special sauces.
 In the city of Cali, the most traditional dish is "sancocho de gallina", a soup composed mostly of chicken, plantain, corn, coriander, yuca root, and other seasonings. Sancocho is usually served with a portion of rice, tostadas (fried plantains), a chicken leg covered in hogao (a tomato and onion sauce), and a slice of avocado. The city is also known for its empanadas (a fried corn dough filled with potatoes and meat),  /  (a fried ball of plantain filled with chicharron, also known as pork rinds), pandebono (a delicious cheese bread made with yucca dough), and aborrajados (sweet ripe fried plantains filled with cheese and served with guava paste). 
 In Bogotá and the Andean region, ajiaco is the traditional dish. It is also a type of soup made with chicken and potatoes, and flavoured with a locally grown herb called "guasca". 
 On the Caribbean coast, spicy dishes including fish and lobster can be found. Coconut rice is a common dish along the coastal cities. The cuisine of the Caribbean is also influenced by Arab traditions, with dishes such as Kibbeh.
 In the Llanos, barbecued meats, such as the "ternera llanera", and river fishes like the "amarillo", are commonly eaten.
 In the Amazonas, the cuisine is influenced by Brazilian and Peruvian traditions.
 Inland, the dishes reflect the mix of Amerindian and European cuisine, and use the products of local agriculture, cattle farming, and river fishing. Such is the case with the sancocho soup in Valledupar, and arepas, a corn based bread-like patty. Local species of animals like the guaratinaja are part of the Wayuu culture.
 In the Andean region of Nariño, a traditional dish is broiled guinea pig (cuy asado), due to influence of Inca cuisine.
 In the Tolima region, the Tamales Tolimenses are a delicacy. These tamales are made of a corn dough and feature peas, carrots, potatoes, rice, chicken, pork, and various spices. They are wrapped in plantain leaves and boiled for three to four hours. Pandebono is eaten for breakfast with hot chocolate.
 On the Islands of San Andres, Providencia, and Santa Catalina, the main dish is rondon, a seafood dish made of coconut milk, fish, conch, cassava root (yuca), sweet potato, white yams, and pumpkin, seasoned with chili peppers and herbs. They also have a crab soup which is considered a delicacy. It is made with the same ingredients as rondon, without the fish.

Piqueteaderos are rustic eateries that serve a variety of fried foods and specialties in platters to share. Offerings can even include huesos cerdos (pig bones) and tarta de seso (brain pie), as well as fried dishes, morcilla, corn on the cob, and other foods common to Colombia.

Dishes and foods

Appetizers and side dishes

Arepas ground maize dough divided into balls and pan fried or grilled corn cakes
Aborrajado deep fried plantains stuffed with cheese
 Arroz con coco, rice with coconut and raisins 
 Hormigas culonas,  large roasted ants, a santandereanas food from Colombia's Santander Department
 Butifarras soledeñas, sausage from Soledad, Atlántico
 Carimañola, yuca fritter stuffed with ground meat, onion and seasonings
 Chunchullo, pig, lamb, cow small intestine
 Hogao Criollo sauce
 Queso blanco white cheese also referred to as queso fresco
 Suero, a topping similar to sour cream
 Patacones Green plantain fried or deep fried squished and fried 
Empanadas, small fritters, made with a mixture of shredded meat, of pork, beef, or chicken'. 
Chicharron deep fried pork rind.
Lentejas (lentil soup) is a standard meal in many Colombian kitchens . The basic method is to soak the lentils for a few hours before adding chopped onion, garlic, and sometimes diced or grated carrots. It is then served with avocado, rice, tomato, and sweet plantain.

Pastries and baked goods

 Almojábana, small cheese buns made with corn flour and cuajada
 Bollos (tubes of ground maize -similar to Italian polenta- or from scratched mandioc/cassava, served with coastal cheese and sometimes whey or butter)
 Buñuelos deep fried dough balls made on Christmas season 
 Achira biscuits
 Carimañolas (like empanadas but made up of manioc)
 Garullas (corn bread roll)
 Pan de sagú (sago bread)
 Pandebono made with cheese made with cassava flour and Costeño cheese
 Pan de Maíz similar to cornbread 
 Pan de yuca (baked cheese bread made with cassava flour)
 Roscón (a soft and sweet bagel filled with either Arequipe or guava jam)

Varieties of arepa

 Arepa Boyacense
 Arepa de arroz
 Arepa de huevo
 Arepa de maiz
 Arepa de queso
 Arepa de yuca
 Arepa ocañera
 Arepa Paisa/Antioqueña
 Arepa Santandereana
 Arepa Valluna
 Arepas de choclo (sweet corn)
 Brown rice and sesame seed arepa
 'Oreja de perro', rice arepas

Fruit

Fruit and juice stands are found across Colombia, particularly on the Caribbean coast. Being a tropical country, Colombia produces a large variety of fruits, such as:

 Aiphanes horrida (corozo)
 Bactris gasipaes, peach-palm (chontaduro)
 Banana passionfruit (curuba)
 Banana (banano)
 Borojoa patinoi (borojó)
 Carambola, starfruit (carambolo)
 Cherimoya (chirimoya)
 Feijoa, Pineapple guava
 Guayabamanzana, Guava-apple hybrid
 Inga edulis, ice-cream-bean (guama)
 Manilkara huberi (níspero)
 Lulo (Naranjilla)
 Mamey sapote (mamey)
 Mamoncillo, Spanish lime
 Mandarin orange (mandarina)
 Mango
 Murrapos, mini-bananas
 Orange (naranja)
 Passiflora edulis, passion fruit (maracuyá)
 Physalis peruviana, Cape gooseberry (uchuva)
 Piñuela
 Pitaya, Dragon fruit (pitahaya)
 Quararibea cordata (zapote)
 Rubus glaucus, similar to blackberry (mora)
 Soursop (guanábana)
 Strawberry guava (arazá)
 Strawberry (fresa)
 Sugar-apple (anón)
 Sweet granadilla (granadilla)
 Syzygium jambos, Malabar plum (pomarrosa)
 Tree tomato,  tamarillo (tomate de árbol)

Native fruit

Colombia is home to numerous tropical fruits that are rarely found elsewhere. Several varieties of banana include a very small, sweet version. Other Colombian fruits include zapote (Quararibea cordata), nispero (Manilkara zapota) lulo (Solanum quitoense), uchuva (Physalis peruviana), papayuela (Vasconcellea pubescens), passion fruit, borojó (Borojoa patinoi), curuba (Passiflora tarminiana), mamoncillo (Melicoccus bijugatus), guanábana (Annona muricata), guava (Psidium guajava), tomate de arbol (tamarillo), noni (Morinda citrifolia). More widespread fruit varieties grown in Colombia include mango, apple, pear, blackberry, and strawberry.

Main courses

 Arroz con Pollo, consists of seasoned rice, chicken, and a variety of vegetables.
Bandeja Paisa, a traditional dish from Antioquia and the "Eje Cafetero" which consists of white rice, red beans, ground beef, plantain, chorizo, morcilla, chicharron, arepa, avocado and a fried egg. Along with Ajiaco, the bandeja paisa is considered to be one of the national dishes.
 Cuchuco, a thick soup made of wheat, fava beans, potatoes, ribs, peas, from Boyacá.
 Cuy asado, broiled guinea pig accompanied by potatoes and popcorn. It is the traditional dish in Nariño.
 Lechona, traditional dish from the Tolima department, a mixture of yellow pea purée and pork meat, with a side of rice  and corn 
 Picada Colombiana, chopped specialties served as a combo platter.
 Tamales are corn or corn/rice "cakes" wrapped in plantain tree leaves and steamed. They can be filled with everything from chicken, potatoes, peas, carrots, to rice. The tamales vary in shape and fillings in each region, and almost every region has its own variation. Some well known variations are from Tolima, Santander, Cúcuta, Bogotá and Valle del Cauca; just to name a few.
Fritanga is another popular Colombian dish made of meats, fried plantains, chicharrones, and yellow potatoes with aji sauce eaten throughout Colombia. Milanesa is another common meat dish throughout the country.
Frijolada, is a robust dish made with a base of pinto or red beans. Frijoles are normally cooked with diced pork or pork hocks, carrots, corn, platano, and sometimes bacon as well. Generally, this dish is also served with rice and avocado. It’s often used as a side dish, and always included within the Bandeja Paisa meal.

Soups
Changua (milk soup with eggs) is a typical breakfast soup of the central Andes region of Colombia, in particular in the Boyacá and Cundinamarca area, including the capital, Bogotá. The dish has Chibcha origins. 
Caldo de costilla, (Spanish for rib broth) is a dish typical of Colombian cuisine, from the Andean region. It is made mainly from beef ribs boiled in water with slices of potato, some garlic, onion and cilantro leaves.
Locro, is a typical dish in Nariño region. It is a corn, beans, zapallo and potato stew.
Mondongo, is a very filling traditional Colombian soup containing a bit of almost everything. The base is made of diced tripe, to which is added several vegetables such as peas, carrots, onions, potatoes, tomatoes, along with garlic, cilantro, and chicken, beef, and/or pork.   
Sancocho, is a popular soup originating from the Valle del Cauca region. It combines vegetables and poultry or fish with recipes differing from one region to the other, but usually contains yuca, maize, and is frequently eaten with banana slices. 
Ajiaco, is a traditional Andean soup that originated from Bogotá. It is a chicken, corn, and potato stew with a hint of guasca (Gallant Soldiers), a local herb.

Desserts and sweets

 Arequipe (Colombia's version of the Dulce de Leche, a milk caramel.)
 Arroz con leche (Sweetened rice with milk).
 Brevas en dulce - candied figs in syrup or arequipe.
 Cocadas - baked coconut confection, similar to macaroons.
 Enyucado cake that has grounded cassava 
Flan type of custard dessert 
 Bocadillo guava paste
 Leche asada, similar to flan but less sweet, made with condensed milk.
 Manjar blanco a boiled, creamy, milk-based spread, thicker than arequipe and sometimes used as a pastry filling.
 Mazamorra white maize drink
 Claro, is a very refreshing cool drink created especially for those not wishing to eat the maize that’s included within Mazamorra. The maize is simply removed from the Mazamorra, a touch of ground Panela is added, and just like that, Claro is ready to be served. 
 Melado, a thick syrup derived from panela.
 Merenguitos, little hardened meringue "cookies"
 Milhoja similar to Mille-feuille or Napoleon (literally means thousand layers)
 Natilla, a Colombian derivation of the Spanish custard natillas, made with milk and cornstarch and spices but without eggs.
 Pastel de Gloria  is a puff pastry containing guava jelly or guava paste and sometimes cheese inside, sprinkled with granulated sugar
Postre De Natas, Milk based Colombian pudding literary means milk skin dessert 
 Torta Maria Luisa Orange cake and between layers any berries jam Decorated with icing sugar, there are various variations around South America
 Tres leches cake, 3 milk cake there are various variations around South America

Beverages

On a per capita basis, Colombia is one of the world's largest consumers of fruit juices, consuming on average more than three quarters of a serving each day.

 Aguapanela is made by dissolving panela (a kind of sugarloaf) in water. Lime juice may be added for flavor. It can be served cold or hot. When served hot it is common for Colombians to put cheese in their aguapanela for it to melt.
 Champús is a thick drink made from corn, pineapple, lulo, and other ingredients.
 Hot chocolate, Colombian hot chocolate is made with milk, water, and bars of semi-sweet chocolate. A special metal pitcher (called a chocolatera) is used for heating and pouring, and a utensil called a molinillo – essentially a stick with paddles at the end – is used for stirring and frothing. Colombian hot chocolate often includes cinnamon, cloves and vanilla.
 Coca tea, an herbal tea made from an infusion of the leaves of the coca plant, considered a mild stimulant and remedy for altitude sickness
 Colombian coffee is known for its quality and distinct flavor. Though much of the world's quality coffee beans come from Colombia, many Colombians commonly drink instant coffee rather than brewed.  It is popularly consumed as a "tinto", meaning black with sugar or panela on the side, or as café con leche, which is à preparation of half coffee and half heated milk. In 2011 UNESCO declared the Coffee Cultural Landscape of Colombia a World Heritage site.
 Colombiana, a kola champagne soda with particular and different taste. (genericized trademark)
 Guandiolo is an Afrocolombian drink made with Borojo fruit that has alleged aphrodisiac properties.
 Lulada is a drink originating from Cali. It is prepared from lulo and has the texture and consistency of a smoothie.
 Malta: Carbonated malt non-alcoholic beverage (genericized trademark).
 Postobón, a variety of soda flavors from the maker of Colombiana, the most popular flavor being apple ("Manzana"). (genericized trademark)
 Salpicón (which literally means large splash) made from diced fruit and soda, usually Colombiana or any Kola flavored soda. It can also be a fruit cocktail beverage (often made with watermelon or mandarin juice).

Alcoholic beverages
 Aguardiente is an alcoholic drink derived from sugarcane and flavored with anise. It is widely consumed at Colombian parties, and ranges in potency from 20% to 40%. It is a variation of the Spanish alcoholic drink.
 Canelazo is an alcoholic version of aguapanela mixed with cinnamon and aguardiente. Sugar is rubbed on the edges of the glass when served.
 Hervido is a local variety of canelazo, traditional in Nariño.
 Chapil is a traditional beverage in Nariño.
 Chicha is a formerly forbidden strong alcoholic beverage originally made by the indigenous peoples of the Andes. It can be prepared from virtually everything, but is typically made from corn. The corn is cooked and grounded with panela which is later wrapped in green plantain leaves and left alone for three days until fermented. It is later mixed with water and any chosen flavors such as orange leaves or spearmint.
 Guarapo is made from various fruits kept in a large ceramic jar and left to ferment for about 2 months. Within that time, panela is added into the liquid to make the alcohol stronger. Grapes and pineapple are typically used. Guarapo is very similar to Chicha.
 Chirrinche, distillated guarapo.
 Masato, It is prepared with rice, sugar, water, cinnamon and whole clove (spice); It is strained and the water is preserved and let aside to have a smooth fermentation.
 Refajo is a type of shandy beverage made by mixing Kola Hipinto (in santanderian region), Colombiana (in cities like Bogota) or Kola Roman (in the Caribbean region), with beer or rum. This mixture of soda and beer is very popular and seen a lot when it comes to accompany foods that are higher in animal fat, generally at barbecues. The combination of the sweetness of the kola and the sourness of the beer and the additional effect of the carbonated soda helps tolerate the fat of some of the typical dishes without hiding their original flavor.
 Sabajón, a sweet and creamy alcoholic drink from the Cordillera Oriental. It is made from eggs and milk with added flavors and juice of fruits and liqueur on half or less concentration.
Viche (or Biche) is a traditional home-brewed Afro-Caribbean alcoholic drink made from sugar cane popular on Colombia’s Pacific Coast.

See also

 Muisca cuisine
 Caribbean cuisine
 Native American cuisine
 South American cuisine

References